Motion is a software application produced by Apple Inc. for their macOS operating system. It is used to create and edit motion graphics, titling for video production and film production, and 2D and 3D compositing for visual effects.

History
The original product, codenamed "Molokini," was previewed at a NAB event on April 19, 2004.

Version 1.0 was made available on August 11, 2004.

At a pre-NAB event in April 2005, Apple released Motion 2 along with new revisions of the other Pro applications, optimised for the Power Mac G5 and Mac OS X 10.4.
Features introduced in Motion 2:
 32-bit Rendering
 Replicators
 New filters
 MIDI behavior
 After Effects integration

In January 2006 Apple stopped selling Motion as a stand-alone product. Introduced at NAB in Las Vegas on April 15, 2007, Motion 3 was included as part of the Final Cut Studio 2 suite.
Features introduced in Motion 3:
 3D multiplane environment - 2.5D compositing
 3D text behaviors
 Vector-based paint strokes
 Point tracking and match moving
 Image stabilization and SmoothCam
 Synchronized Audio behavior
 Dynamic retiming behaviors
 Advanced Keyframe Editor - keyframe pen tool,  transform box
 Final Cut Pro integration - Motion 3 master templates

Motion 4 was introduced on July 23, 2009.
New features included:
 3D Shadows
 3D Reflections
 Depth of Field
 Credit Rolls
 Adjust Glyph tool
 Parameter Link behavior
 Camera framing
 Improved Sequence Text behavior, plus new presets
 New text generators
 New graphics generators
 New filters
 Multi-touch gesture support
 ProRes 4444 support
 Background export

Motion 5 was introduced on June 21, 2011. Motion 5 was once again sold as a stand-alone product. It is available through the Mac App Store at a reduced price of $49.99.
New features:
 Final Cut Pro X plugin generation
 Parameter rigs
 New keyer
 64-bit architecture

Motion 5.2 was released on April 13, 2015.
New features:

 3D text
 New generators
 Improved shapes
 Improved keyframing

Motion 5.3 was released on October 27, 2016.
 Wide colour
 Improved Link parameter behavior
 New Align To behavior
 Improved 3D text

Motion 5.4 was released on December 14, 2017, with new features:
 360 VR motion graphics support
 The ability to switch a current Motion document to be a Motion project, Final Cut Pro generator, Final Cut Pro title, Final Cut Pro effect, or Final Cut Pro transition
 New Overshoot animation behavior
 New filters for different photographic looks
 Import, playback, and editing of HEVC video clips and HEIF photos.
 Faster optical flow analysis

Motion 5.4.1 was released on April 9, 2018.
New feature:
 ProRes RAW
 Bug fixes

Motion 5.4.2 was released on November 15, 2018.
New features:
 Advanced color grading
 Comic filter
 Tiny Planet filter - for displaying 360° spherical video in non-360° projects
 Bug fixes - including use of Core Text engine for improved display of non-roman text

Motion 5.4.3 was released on March 21, 2019.
New feature:
 Post-macOS Mojave media compatibility checker

Motion 5.4.4 was released on October 7, 2019.
 New Metal-based processing engine improves playback and accelerates graphics tasks including rendering, compositing, real-time effects, exporting, and more
 Enhances graphics performance with support for multiple GPUs including Radeon Pro Vega II and Radeon Pro Vega II Duo on Mac Pro
 Optimizes CPU performance with support for up to 28 CPU cores on Mac Pro
 Accelerates ProRes and ProRes RAW playback when using the Afterburner card on Mac Pro
 View, composite, grade, and deliver stunning HDR video on Pro Display XDR
 View High Dynamic Range video tone-mapped to compatible Standard Dynamic Range displays when using Motion on macOS Catalina
 Improved load balancing of graphics processing across multiple GPUs

Motion 5.4.6 was released on August 25, 2020.
3D object support
 Add 3D objects as elements in Title, Generator, Effect and Transition templates
 Animate a 3D object's position, rotation, and scale using keyframes
 Use behaviors to easily add realistic and complex animations to 3D objects
 Use 3D objects with tools like replicators, emitters, lights or cameras
 Use a collection of 60 premade 3D objects in the Motion library
 Import USDZ objects from third-party websites and developers
 Adjust 3D object environment lighting in the project inspector

Motion 5.5.1 was released on March 4, 2021.
 Adds a new Auto-Shrink option to the Text Layout tab of the Inspector to automatically reduce text size to fit in a paragraph, scroll, or crawl layout
 Includes UI refinements for macOS Big Sur
 Includes stability and reliability improvements
See also a release history in context with the rest of Final Cut Studio.

Market position
Motion is a motion graphics and  compositing application similar in some ways to After Effects and Nuke. With version 3, Apple added 3D compositing, vector paint, and motion tracking to Motion's toolbox. This added power, plus the GPU accelerated nature of Motion, allows it to be seen as an alternative to those packages for titling and simple animation projects.

Features

Features of Motion include the ability to create custom particle effects (as well as using pre-built ones) and to add filters, effects and animations in real time. Motion has the ability to address up to 32 GB of RAM and GPU acceleration at 8-bit, 16-bit and 32-bit float color depths. Motion 2 can also integrate with a MIDI keyboard, so that parameters can be controlled by keys or faders; this opens up the possibility of real time parameter input into Motion. In addition Motion 3 now allows for complete 2D and 3D compositing in a multiplane environment.

Behaviors

As well as supporting traditional keyframe animation, Motion introduced a system of pre-set 'behaviors' which can be combined to create realistic animations. For instance, the 'throw' behaviour will move an object across the screen. Combined with the 'gravity' behavior, it will simulate a realistic arc of motion. The effects can be tweaked utilizing various parameters, varying the strength of the bounces, the amount of gravity to apply and so on.

This is very different from traditional animation software, which requires the use of keyframes to determine the position of an object at any given time.  Such software then automatically creates motion to fill the spaces between the keyframes.  This makes it easy to know exactly where objects are on the screen at any given time, but it is considerably more difficult to create realistic animations that build up on different, conflicting forces.

The Replicator and Particle Emitters

In Version 2 a new 'replicator' function was introduced, which allows an object to be replicated to create a repeating pattern of a specified size and shape.  With this tool, it is  possible to create animations in which the elements of a replicated pattern move in sequence.

'Particle emitters' allow the user to set a pre-drawn shape to rapidly generate copies of itself and emit them across the screen. The direction and intensity can be adjusted, and combined with behaviors to create very complex animations quickly and easily. For example, a particle emitter used in conjunction with a star shape and the 'vortex' behaviour would animate a circle of swirling stars.

The H.U.D.

Motion features a floating semi-transparent window ("heads-up display", or HUD) which displays the most commonly altered parameters of the object or effect currently selected. This allows the user to make quick adjustments without having to search through palettes and menus. However, exact numerical values cannot be entered in this window. For more precise editing, consult the Inspector window.

Tools
Motion has the following tools available for the creation or manipulation of graphics on the canvas:
 Anchor point - each object has an 'anchor point' that acts as the centre of rotation or enlargement.
 Shear mapping
 Drop shadow
 Four Corner, which changes the perspective of objects.
 Crop
 Bézier curve adjustment
 Rectangle, ellipse, Bézier curve and B-spline creation tools.
 The text tool.
 Rectangle, ellipse, Bézier and B-spline masking tools (which define the part of an object that is visible).
These tools can be accessed from the toolbar at the top of the screen or with keyboard commands.

Recording

Recording is used for adjusting an object over a specific amount of time by placing and manipulating keyframes.  The recording button is a red dot button adjacent to the play/pause features.  When the button is selected, it lights up red and the dot turns white.  Any adjustments made when the button is selected are saved as keyframes.  Keyframes act as placeholders that solidify an object's characteristics at a single frame (anything from position and rotation to cropping and size).  Using multiple recordings, an object shall reorient itself between the two keyframes to match each set characteristics.  Recording can act as an alternative to movement behaviors that allow more in-depth adjustments.

How Motion works
Motion uses pixel shaders which move the processing of video effects to the Graphics Processing Unit (GPU) of a modern graphics card.  Motion is also compatible with Apple's Core Image technology, allowing one to use the Image Units that come standard with Mac OS X Tiger.  Like pixel shaders, Core Image 'stacks' various effects, allowing a number of effects to be combined without slow-down.  A faster graphics card improves performance.  Motion is also the first Pro App to introduce FxPlug Apple's plug-in architecture that allows for GPU acceleration.

In Motion, users import their own graphics files and use pre-prepared graphics such as text and shapes.  Objects can be grouped into layers, but they always retain their own distinct identity.  These various parts are then grouped into a single layer.  Selecting that layer permits moving all of the objects as a single body...

Similar products
 Nuke – The Foundry
 Autodesk Flame – Autodesk
 Adobe After Effects
 VSDC Free Video Editor
 Fusion – Blackmagic Design
 Boris RED – Boris FX
 Natron

While not dedicated to compositing, the open source software Blender contains a limited node-based compositing feature which, among other things is capable of basic keying and blurring effects.

References 
 Wiggins, P. (August 2004). Motion 1. First review of Motion".
 Lindsay, A. (November 2004). Motion. DV, 12, 54 – 58.

External links 
 Official website

MacOS-only software made by Apple Inc.
Video editing software
Compositing software